is a former Japanese football player.

Playing career
Ando was born in Shizuoka Prefecture on May 23, 1974. After graduating from Komazawa University, he joined J1 League club Urawa Reds in 1997. In September, he moved to Avispa Fukuoka on loan and played many matches. In 1998, he returned to Urawa Reds. However he could hardly play in the match behind Yuki Takita and Hisashi Tsuchida until 2000. From 2001, although Takita and Tsuchida retired, Ando could not play many matches behind young goalkeeper Yohei Nishibe and Norihiro Yamagishi. In July 2002, he moved to J2 League club Omiya Ardija. He battles with Eiji Kawashima and Hiroki Aratani for the position and he played many matches. The club also won the 2nd place in 2004 and was promoted to J1 from 2005. However he could hardly play in the match behind Aratani from 2005 and he retired end of 2006 season.

Club statistics

References

External links

1974 births
Living people
Komazawa University alumni
Association football people from Shizuoka Prefecture
Japanese footballers
J1 League players
J2 League players
Urawa Red Diamonds players
Avispa Fukuoka players
Omiya Ardija players
Association football goalkeepers